Dennis R. Glass (born 1949) is the President and CEO of Lincoln National Corporation. He also served as the chairman of the board of the American Council of Life Insurers.

Glass was formerly the President and CEO of Jefferson Pilot Corporation, which merged with Lincoln Financial Group in 2006. Before joining Jefferson Pilot Corporation in 1993, he held executive-level finance and investment positions with Protective Life and Northwestern Mutual. He became the president and chief operating officer of Lincoln Financial Group in April 2006 and was appointed as Lincoln Financial's CEO in 2007.

Glass is a graduate of the University of Wisconsin–Milwaukee, where he obtained his B.A. and MBA degrees in business administration in 1971 and 1973.

References

External links
 Dennis R. Glass's Bio Lincoln National

Living people
1949 births
American chief executives of financial services companies
American businesspeople in insurance
University of Wisconsin–Milwaukee alumni
American chief operating officers